Listed here are those dubbed "knight banneret" in England.

Under English custom the rank of knight banneret could only be conferred by the sovereign on the field of battle. There were some technical exceptions to this; when his standard was on the field of battle he could be regarded as physically present though he was not. His proxy could be regarded as a sufficient substitution for his presence.

Edward III
Battle of Crécy
26 August 1346, Sir John de Lisle, of Rougemont, Devon – by writ 
1346 Giles dit Paonet de Roet with one or two esquires; a Guyenne Herald and household knight of Edward III.
1348, Sir Henry de Braylesford, of Brailsford, Derbyshire.  He was nominated to represent Stafford, serving under William de Clinton, 1st Earl of Huntingdon until he returned home by royal letter of protection because he was invalided out of the King's division.  He was exonerated from assessment of his lands in Derby and Stafford on 10 October 1349.

Battle of Nájera
1367, Sir John Chandos during the Spanish Campaign led by the Edward, the Black Prince (eldest son of King Edward III and father to King Richard II).

Edward IV
Knights banneret created by King Edward IV on that voyage and late journey [ie after the Battle of Tewkesbury and on the journey to London, where the Bastard of Fauconbridge was beaten off]; whose pennons and standards (in the difference from pennants) were rent by royal command.

Knights banneret created in Scotland by Richard, Duke of Gloucester, probably on the conclusion of Treaty of Fotheringhay (11 June 1482) between the Duke of Gloucester, Alexander, Duke of Albany and the Scottish nobles near Edinburgh.

Knights banneret created by Richard, Duke of Gloucester, in Scotland at Hutton Field beside Berwick, probably at the surrendering of Berwick to the English, which took place on 24 August 1482.
22 August 1482, Thomas Pilkington.
22 August 1482, Robert Ryder.

Henry VII
Knights banneret created by King Henry VII at the battle of Stoke Field the first three were appointed before the battle and the other eleven after:

Knights banneret created by King Henry VII after the battle of Deptford Bridge (also called the battle of Blackheath) which took place during the Cornish Rebellion of 1497.

Knights banneret created in Scotland by Thomas, Earl of Surrey, King Henry VII's lieutenant in the north, on or before 30 September 1497:

Henry VIII
Knights banneret created by King Henry VIII possibly at the battle of the Spurs in France (16 August 1513) but they may have been appointed the following year. 

Knight banneret created at Leith in Scotland on Sunday 11 May 1544, by Edward, Earl of Hertford, the King's lieutenant, at the burning of Edinburgh, Leith and elsewhere.

 11 May 1544, Edward, Lord Clinton (later Earl of Lincoln).

Knight banneret created by the Earl of Hertford, the King's lieutenant, being then encamped at our Lady Church by Norham Castle on his coming home after he had been in Scotland 15 days. 
 23 September 1545, John Nevill, 4th Lord Latimer.

Edward VI
Knights banneret were created at the camp beside Roxburgh (18–25 September 1547), in Scotland, during the first year of the reign of King Edward VI. by the "hands of the high and mighty Prince Edward, Duke of Somerset, Lieutenant-General of all the King's armies by land and sea, and Governor of his Royal person and Protector of all his realms, dominions and subjects".

18–25 September 1547, Francys Bryan.
18–25 September 1547, Ralph Sadler.
18–25 September 1547, Raufe Vane.
18–25 September 1547, William, 13th Lord Grey de Wilton.

Charles I
King Charles I created several knights banneret after the battle of Edgehill (1642) including:
Thomas Strickland, of Sizergh for gallantry.
John Smith for rescuing the Royal Standard under enemy fire.

Great Britain and the United Kingdom
Whether any appointments as knight banneret were formally made after the Act of Union 1707 is debated by historians and there is no general agreement.

George II
George Cokayne notes in The Complete Peerage (1913) that King George II revived the honour when he created sixteen knights banneret on the field of the battle of Dettingen on 27 June 1743:

Although Cokayne's source for this, a diary entry by Miss Gertrude Savile, states "This honour had been laid aside since James I, when Baronets were instituted", which contradicts other sources, a news magazine published in the same year as the battle recorded the honours.

George III
Several sources, including Edward Brenton (1828) and William James (1827), record that Captains Trollope and Fairfax were honoured as bannerets by King George III for their actions during the battle of Camperdown (1797). However, these awards were never recorded in The London Gazette and is much more likely that these knighthoods, which first appear in formal records in December 1797 without their nature being specified, were as knights bachelor.

Victoria
On 19 August 1843 James Bombrain, Inspector-General of Coast Guard in Ireland (knighted by the Lord-Lieutenant of Ireland, on board a cruiser in Kingstown Harbour, after an inspection  of the Irish squadron of revenue cruisers at Kingstown, Dublin, is erroneously supposed to have been a knight banneret in consequence of having been knighted under the Royal Standard).

Notes

References

External links
 Burke's World Orders of Knighthood and Merit

 
English knights
banneret